Geodessus is a genus of beetles in the family Dytiscidae, containing the following species:

 Geodessus besucheti Brancucci, 1979
 Geodessus kejvali Balke & Hendrich, 1996

References

Dytiscidae